"In Kümmernis und Dunkelheit" or "Schwarz-Rot-Gold" was a revolutionary poem by Ferdinand Freiligrath written on 17 March 1848 in London and later set to music by Robert Schumann.

History 
In 1848, the German revolution began. Liberal pressure spread through many of the German states, each of which experienced the revolutions in its own way.
The street demonstrations of workers and artisans in Paris, France, from February 22 through 24, 1848, resulted in the abdication of King Louis Philippe and his departure from France to live in Britain, was the immediate spur to revolt in Germany.
The revolution spread across Europe and started in Germany with the large demonstrations on March 13, 1848, in Vienna, Austria, which resulted in the resignation of Prince von Metternich as chief minister to Emperor Ferdinand I of Austria and his departure from Austria to live in Britain. Because of the date of these demonstrations, the revolutions in Germany are usually called the March Revolution (German: Märzrevolution).

On 17 March 1848, Ferdinand Freiligrath wrote a poem dedicated to these events. It incites all Germans to take up arms in order to liberate Germany from its princes and create a united German republic under the black, red and golden flag. The poem was set to music by Robert Schumann on 4 April 1848.

Lyrics

See also 
 Regina (Lortzing)

Notes

External links 

 "In Kümmernis und Dunkelheit" on YouTube.

German patriotic songs
Poetry by Ferdinand Freiligrath
Revolutions of 1848
1848 in Germany
Protests in Germany
Rebellions in Germany
Compositions by Robert Schumann